Richard Sloan may refer to:

Richard Elihu Sloan (1857–1933), territorial governor of Arizona
Richard Sloan (artist) (1935–2007), American artist
Richard Sloan, editor of Review of Accounting Studies

See also
Rick Sloan, American athlete
Rick Sloane, American cult filmmaker